The Grib mine is one of the largest diamond mines in Russia and in the world. The Grib diamond pipe is named in honor of Vladimir Grib, a post-graduate member of the exploration team, led by Andrѐy V. Sinitsyn, who died prior to the mine's discovery.  The mine is located in the north-western part of the country in the Arkhangelsk Oblast. The mine has estimated reserves of 98.5 million carats of diamonds and an annual production capacity of 3.62 million carats.

References 

Diamond mines in Russia